Prisoner is the debut studio album by Australian indie rock band The Jezabels. It was self-released on 16 September 2011 and internationally through PIAS Recordings, Mom + Pop Music and Dine Alone Records. It was recorded at Sydney's Attic Studios with producer Lachlan Mitchell and mixed by Peter Katis. Prisoner was news.com.au Entertainment's album of the week during the week of its release. The album won the 2011 Australian Music Prize and was described as "a cocktail of power and elegance, rising like a force to be reckoned with. Dramatic, creative songwriting is delivered with ferocity by commanding front woman Hayley Mary. The Jezabels have firmly cemented their place in the Australian music industry and abroad."

At the J Awards of 2011, the album was nominated for Australian Album of the Year.

The album won Album of the Year at the 2012 Rolling Stone Australia Awards.

Track listing
All tracks written by Hayley Mary, Heather Shannon, Sam Lockwood, and Nik Kaloper

Charts

Weekly charts

Year-end charts

Certifications

References

2011 debut albums
ARIA Award-winning albums
Mom + Pop Music albums
The Jezabels albums